Dupetit-Thouars was a   armoured cruiser of the French Navy.

Design and description
Designed by the naval architect Emile Bertin, the Gueydon-class ships were intended to fill the commerce-raiding strategy of the Jeune École. Dupetit-Thouars displaced . The ship had a crew of 566 officers and enlisted men.

The Gueydon class had three vertical triple-expansion steam engines, each driving a single propeller shaft.

The Gueydons had a main armament that consisted of two 40-caliber  guns that were mounted in single gun turrets, one each fore and aft of the superstructure. Their secondary armament comprised eight 45-caliber quick-firing (QF) Canon de  Modèle 1893 guns in casemates. For anti-torpedo boat defense, they carried four 45-caliber QF Canon de  Modèle 1891 guns on the forecastle deck, as well as ten QF  and four QF  Hotchkiss guns. They were also armed with two submerged  torpedo tubes.

The Harvey armor belt of the Gueydon-class cruisers covered most of the ships' hull.

Construction and career

Dupetit-Thouars took part in the First World War.

In 1918, she was part of the Atlantic Naval Division, under Commander Paqué, and tasked with escort duty. On 7 August 1918, escorting a 24-ship convoy inbound from New York, she was torpedoed by the submarine , off Brest. At nightfall, at 20:51, a torpedo hit the port side underneath the forward bridge, followed ten seconds after by another under the aft bridge. The explosions killed three men, and neither the submarine nor her periscope were spotted, although a Lieutenant detected the first torpedo shortly before it hit.

Assessment of the ship soon revealed extensive damage, but as the list was moderate, the officers deemed that although the ship was lost, she would not sink rapidly. They moved the ship off the route of the convoy, radioed a distress call, and stopped the engines to allow the crew to evacuate. The list then started to increase while the crew abandoned ship. Fifty minutes after the torpedo hit, Dupetit-Thouars rolled over and sank, killing ten sailors still aboard trying to launch the last raft. Following the sinking, U-62 surfaced to inquire as to the name and tonnage of the cruiser, and collect a ribbon from a sailor's hat.

Dupetit-Thouars was mentioned in dispatches at the Army level on 25 October 1919, the mention stating

Notes

Bibliography

 

 
 

1901 ships
Ships built in France
Gueydon-class cruisers
World War I cruisers of France
World War I shipwrecks in the Atlantic Ocean
Ships sunk by German submarines in World War I
Maritime incidents in 1918
Dupetit Thouars family